Pest Control is the second studio album by the American rock band Devilhead.

Track listing

Personnel
Brian Wood - vocals, guitar
Kevin Wood - guitar
Mike Stone - drums, piano
Cory Kane - bass, organ
Tim Young - banjo, guitar, vocals
Tyler Willman - vocals

External links
Pest Control at Allmusic

Devilhead albums
1996 albums